Professor T. may refer to:

 Professor T. (Belgian TV series) - the original series, which ran for 3 seasons in 2015, 2016 and 2018 (titled simply "T" in Masterpiece Theatre's US airing).
 Professor T. (German TV series) - 2017 remake.
 Professor T. (British TV series) - 2021 remake airing on ITV and Britbox.